The Cool Ones (aka Cool, Baby Cool) is a 1967 film starring Roddy McDowall and directed by Gene Nelson. The 1960s novelty singer known as Mrs. Miller performs in a cameo role, and the film features performances by the bands the Leaves and the Bantams as well as a brief appearance by Glen Campbell, playing a fictional singer.

Plot
Hallie Rodgers is a backup singer on the TV show, Whizbang. One evening she boldly steps out of the chorus and begins singing “Just One of Those Things.” The young people in the audience love her singing, but the producer, Fred MacElewine, fires her. 

A little later she goes into a bar and Cliff Donner, a former singing star, tells Hallie he saw her on television and liked her singing. Tony Krum, a music promotor, suggests Hallie and Cliff sing together, and the duo become popular recording artists. They also fall in love.

Cast

In an uncredited appearance: one of the dancers is Teri Garr, specifically as one of the Whiz-Bam girls.

Reception
The film received mostly negative reviews and is now viewed as something of a 60's cult musical. From the blog Comet Over Hollywood:The Cool Ones has earned a place on my list of the worst movies that I have ever seen. But then at the same time, it’s so bad you can’t look away and have to watch the whole movie.
And from the New York Times:The Cool Ones [is] a rock 'n' roll comedy, so-called, about a pop singer (Debbie Watson) who is on the rise and a big-name crooner (Gil Peterson) who is on the skids. Roddy McDowall is their manager who engineers them into a publicity romance which has—shall we say?—repercussions. I venture to guess this will disgust even the kids.

See also
List of American films of 1967

References

External links
 
 
 
 

1967 films
1967 comedy films

American satirical films
Films about music and musicians
Films set in California
1960s teen comedy films
American teen comedy films
Warner Bros. films
Publicity stunts in fiction
Films directed by Gene Nelson
1960s English-language films
1960s American films